Myers's theorem, also known as the Bonnet–Myers theorem, is a celebrated, fundamental  theorem in the mathematical field of Riemannian geometry.  It was discovered by Sumner Byron Myers in 1941. It asserts the following:

In the special case of surfaces, this result was proved by Ossian Bonnet in 1855. For a surface, the  Gauss, sectional, and Ricci curvatures are all the same, but Bonnet's proof easily generalizes to higher dimensions if one assumes a positive lower bound on the  sectional curvature. Myers' key contribution was therefore to show that a Ricci lower bound is all that is needed to reach the same conclusion.

Corollaries

As a very particular case, this shows that any complete and noncompact smooth Riemannian manifold which is Einstein must have nonpositive Einstein constant.

Consider the smooth universal covering map  One may consider the Riemannian metric  on  Since  is a local diffeomorphism, Myers' theorem applies to the Riemannian manifold  and hence  is compact. This implies that the fundamental group of is finite.

Cheng's diameter rigidity theorem
The conclusion of Myers' theorem says that for any  one has . In 1975, Shiu-Yuen Cheng proved:

See also

References

 Ambrose, W. A theorem of Myers. Duke Math. J. 24 (1957), 345–348.
 
 
 

Differential geometry
Geometric inequalities
Theorems in Riemannian geometry